Bareina  is a Bedouin village and rural commune in the Trarza Region of south-western Mauritania.  In 2000 it had a population of 14,987.

References

Communes of Trarza Region